Highland State Recreation Area is a  state recreation area in the southeast part of the U.S. state of Michigan.

Haven Hill Natural Area, within the Highland State Recreation Area, was designated in 1976 as a  National Natural Landmark.

Recreation Area
The Michigan Department of Natural Resources (MDNR), which owns and operates Highland, describes the recreation area as a parcel of forest, wetland, and kettle lakes primarily operated for light camping and drive-in/drive-out recreational day use.   of trails in the recreation area are designated for hiking, mountain biking, and equestrian sports.

The highland for which this recreation area is named is this group of moraines.

National Natural Landmark
South of Highland Road and east of Duck Lake Road lies the  Haven Hill Natural Area and National Natural Landmark, a component unit of the Highland Recreation Area.  MDNR describes Haven Hill as an area that contains "all of southern Michigan's principal forest types within one small area, including swamp forest of tamarack, cedar, beech-maple forest, oak-hickory forest, and mixed hardwood forest.  The area has remained largely undisturbed for the past 75 years."  Haven Hill was preserved as a natural area first by auto magnate Edsel Ford, whose estate it was, and then by MDNR after Ford's death in 1943.

Today
The Highland State Recreation Area, and the Haven Hill Natural Area embedded within the recreation area, are both located on M-59 directly west of Pontiac, Michigan.  The nearest limited-access highway is U.S. Highway 23 at M-59/Highland Road.

Gallery

References

External links
Friends of Highland Recreation Area
Highland Recreation Area Pure Michigan
The Haven Hill Project
Haven Hill Project Blog
Haven Hill Project, Complete Haven Hill History
Haven Hill Project, First History Hike Video
Haven Hill Arch, White Lake, Michigan Waymarking.com
Haven Hill Natural Area Protected Planet (World Database on Protected Areas)

National Natural Landmarks in Michigan
Protected areas of Oakland County, Michigan
Protected areas established in 1976
State recreation areas of Michigan
1976 establishments in Michigan